Candice Joy Hansen-Koharcheck is a planetary scientist. She is responsible for the development and operation of the JunoCam, for which she received the NASA's Outstanding Public Leadership Medal in 2018.

Education and career 
Hansen received her Bachelor of Science in Physics from California State University, Fullerton in 1976. While here she was taught by Dorothy Woolum, who had worked on the Apollo program. This led her to pursue a career in planetary science. After graduating Hansen started graduate school at the University of Arizona, but left to work NASA's Jet Propulsion Laboratory (JPL). Here, she worked on the Voyager mission as part of the Voyager Imaging Team. She designed the imaging sequences for the flybys with Jupiter, Saturn, Uranus and Neptune. From 1981 to 1984, when the Voyager was between Saturn and Uranus, Hansen worked at German Space Operations Center in Oberpfaffenhofen. While working at JPL, Hansen completed a Master of Science in planetary physics (1989) and her PhD in Earth and Space Science (1994) at UCLA.

In 1990 Hansen started working on the Cassini mission as part of the Ultraviolet Imaging Spectrograph (UVIS) investigation team, where she is still co-investigator. She received the 2002 JPL Exceptional Leadership Award for her involvement in the planning of the Jupiter flyby.  Hansen is part of the team within the Cassini mission that studies the plumes on Enceladus, one of Saturn's moons. This research has confirmed the idea that there are subsurface bodies of water on Enceladus. For her work on the water vapor plumes on Enceladus, Hansen received the Edward Stone Award in 2007 and the NASA Exceptional Scientific Achievement Medal in 2009.

Hansen retired from the JPL in 2010, but continues her work as senior scientist at the Planetary Science Institute in Tucson, Arizona.

Hansen is currently deputy Principal Investigator for the High Resolution Imaging Science Experiment (HiRISE) on the Mars Reconnaissance Orbiter. As part of HiRISE, Hansen studies the seasonal carbon-dioxide ice on Mars. She ran experiments on earth using dry ice to study the possibility of carbon dioxide ice to be responsible for the gullies that were seen in the HiRISE images. She also co-authored a book titled 'Mars: The Pristine Beauty of the Red Planet', a collection of HiRISE images.

Hansen is a collaborator on the Juno mission, and she is responsible for the JunoCam, the first interplanetary outreach camera. The camera has produced the first close-up images of Jupiter's polar region. It was also used to capture images of volcanic plumes on Io, one of Jupiter's moons. For her work on the JunoCam, she received the NASA Outstanding Public Leadership medal in 2018.

Awards 
 2002 JPL Exceptional Leadership Award for her involvement in the planning of the Jupiter flyby in the Cassini mission.
 2007 Edward Stone Award for work on the water vapor plumes on Enceladus.
 2009 NASA Exceptional Scientific Achievement Medal for work on the water vapor plumes on Enceladus.
 2018 NASA Outstanding Public Leadership medal for work on JunoCam.

References 

Year of birth missing (living people)
Living people
NASA people
Women planetary scientists
Planetary scientists
California State University, Fullerton alumni
UCLA Department of Earth Planetary and Space Sciences alumni